Popovići may refer to:

 Popovići, Serbia, a village near Kraljevo
 Popovići, Dubrovnik-Neretva County, a village in Konavle, Croatia
 Popovići, Zadar County, a village near Benkovac, Croatia
 Popovići Žumberački, a former village near Ozalj, Croatia
 Popovići, Glamoč, a village near Glamoč, Bosnia and Herzegovina
 Popovići (Ilijaš), a village near Ilijaš, Bosnia and Herzegovina
 Popovići, Kalinovik, a village near Kalinovik, Bosnia and Herzegovina
 Popovići, Prnjavor, a village near Prnjavor, Bosnia and Herzegovina

See also
 Popović (singular)